Holmes and Holmes (stylized as Holmes+Holmes) is a Canadian television reality show, which premiered on HGTV Canada in 2016. The show features contractor Mike Holmes and his son Mike Holmes Jr. renovating homes.

History
The first season of the show concentrated entirely on the duo renovating Mike Jr.'s own home in preparation for his wedding to his longtime girlfriend Lisa. The second season, which premiered in 2018, saw them purchasing and working on flipping projects.

Shelagh Cooke received a Canadian Screen Award nomination for Best Direction in a Lifestyle or Information Series at the 7th Canadian Screen Awards in 2019, for the episode "Water: The Good, the Bad and the Money".

The series was picked up for a third season on the DIY Network.  The 12-episode season was scheduled to premiere mid-2019 but launch date was later pushed to October 2, 2019.

References

External links

2010s Canadian reality television series
2016 Canadian television series debuts
HGTV (Canada) original programming
English-language television shows
The Holmes Group